Für dich immer noch Fanta Sie is the eighth studio album by German hip hop group Die Fantastischen Vier.

Track listing
Wie Gladiatoren – 3:44
Dann mach doch mal – 4:11
Gebt uns ruhig die Schuld (den Rest könnt ihr behalten) – 4:14
Für dich immer noch Fanta Sie Teil 1 – 1:46
Junge trifft Mädchen – 4:28
Garnichsotoll – 5:10
Smudo in Zukunft – 3:01
Danke – 4:08
Die Lösung – 4:12
Schnauze – 3:35
Für immer zusammen – 4:24
Für dich immer noch Fanta Sie Teil 2 – 1:37
Das letzte Mal – 4:06
Kaputt – 4:19
Mantra – 5:49
Was wollen wir noch mehr? – 5:16

Charts

Weekly charts

Year-end charts

References

Die Fantastischen Vier albums
2010 albums